MS222 or variant, may refer to:

 Tricaine mesylate (MS-222) anesthetic
 Morane-Saulnier MS.222 airplane
 Simon master MS 222 manuscript
 Minuscule 222 (MS222), A404, a Greek minuscule manuscript of the New Testament

See also

 MS-2 (disambiguation)
 MS 22 (disambiguation)